Tongue ( from ) is a coastal village in northwest Highland, Scotland, in the western part of the former county of Sutherland. It lies on the east shore above the base of the Kyle of Tongue and north of the mountains Ben Hope and Ben Loyal on the A836. To the north lies the area of Braetongue.

Tongue is the main village in a series of crofting townships that runs through Coldbackie, Dalharn, Blandy, and the harbour of Scullomie to the deserted township of Slettel. The village includes a youth hostel, a craft shop, a general store and garage, a bank, a post office and two hotels, the Tongue Hotel and the Ben Loyal Hotel. It is connected to the west side of the Kyle by the Kyle of Tongue Bridge and Causeway, built in 1971.

Toponymy
Contrary to popular belief, the name Tongue does not refer to the shape of the Kyle of Tongue (though the kyle can be described as "tongue-shaped"). Rather it is a geographical term in Old Norse which refers to a piece of land shaped like a spit or tongue. That tongue of land projecting into the Kyle is the terminal moraine of the Kyle of Tongue glacier, and forms the eastern part of the Kyle of Tongue causeway.

In Gaelic, Tunga indicates the village, whereas Caol Thunga indicates the kyle. The village is also known as Ceann Tàile and formerly as Circeabol.

History
The area was an historic crossroad for Gaels, Picts and Vikings.

Tongue House is the historic seat of the Clan Mackay, after they abandoned Castle Varrich (Caisteal Bharraich). The ruins of the castle, built at Tongue in the eleventh century after the clan were expelled from their ancestral Province of Moray to County Sutherland, are a popular tourist attraction. A battle for succession some time around 1427 to 1433 culminated in the Battle of Drumnacoub, in which two factions of the clan fought on Carn Fada, between the Kyle and Ben Loyal.

The village saw a key battle between a Jacobite treasure ship and two ships of the Royal Navy in 1746, which resulted in the Jacobite crew trying to slip ashore with their gold. They were then caught by the Navy, supported by local people who were loyal to Hanover, which cost Bonnie Prince Charlie valuable support in the run-up to Culloden.

In the Highland Clearances, many people who were cleared from the interior of Sutherland moved to this village. The Gaelic poet Ewen Robertson (1842–95) lived in Tongue his entire life, and is most famous for his song "Mo mhallachd aig na caoraich mhòr" ("My curses on the Border sheep") mocking, among others, the Duchess of Sutherland and Patrick Sellar. The song has been recorded by notable singers Julie Fowlis and Kathleen MacInnes. There is a monument to Robertson in Tongue.

U.S. Senator from Tennessee, treasury secretary, and diplomat George W. Campbell was born in Tongue before emigrating to North Carolina.

See also
 Tongue Bay

Notes and references

 
 

Populated places in Sutherland
National scenic areas of Scotland
Protected areas of Highland (council area)